Sénas is a commune in the Bouches-du-Rhône department in the Provence-Alpes-Côte d'Azur region in Southern France. In 2019, it had a population of 6,894. Sénas is located on the departmental border with Vaucluse, which follows the river Durance.

Demographics

See also
 Alpilles
 Communes of the Bouches-du-Rhône department

References

Communes of Bouches-du-Rhône
Bouches-du-Rhône communes articles needing translation from French Wikipedia